The 2006 San Diego City Council election occurred on November 7, 2006. The primary election was held on June 6, 2006. Four of the eight seats of the San Diego City Council were contested. All four incumbent council members  stood for reelection.

Municipal elections in California are officially non-partisan, although most candidates do identify a party preference. A two-round system was used for the election, starting with a primary in June followed by a runoff in November between the top-two candidates if no candidate received a majority of the votes in the first round. Since each incumbent was reelected with a majority in the June primary, there were no city council runoffs in the November general election.

Campaign

The 2006 election used the eight district boundaries created by the 2000 Redistricting Commission. Seats in districts 2, 4, 6, and 8 were up for election.

Although the election featured four incumbent candidates, only Donna Frye had previously served a full term on the city council. Kevin Faulconer and Ben Hueso both were serving partial terms after winning special elections to fill the seats vacated by the resignations of Michael Zucchet and Ralph Inzunza respectively. Tony Young had also served a partial term after winning a special election to fill the vacancy created by the death of Charles L. Lewis.

Results

District 2 
District 2 consisted of the communities of Bankers Hill/Park West, Downtown San Diego, La Jolla/Mount Soledad, Little Italy, Midway/North Bay, Mission Beach, Mission Hills, Ocean Beach, Old Town, Pacific Beach, and Point Loma. Incumbent council member Kevin Faulconer, who had previously been elected to a partial term in 2005 after the resignation of Michael Zucchet, was reelected with a majority of the votes in the June primary.

District 4 
District 4 consisted of the communities of Alta Vista, Broadway Heights, Chollas View, Emerald Hills, Encanto, Jamacha, Lincoln Park, Lomita Village, Mount Hope, Mountain View, North Bay Terrace, Oak Park, O'Farrell, Paradise Hills, Ridgeview, Skyline Hills, South Bay Terrace, Valencia Park, and Webster. Incumbent council member Tony Young, who had previously been elected to a partial term in 2004 after the death of Charles L. Lewis, was reelected with a majority of the votes in the June primary.

District 6 
District 6 consisted of the communities of Bay Ho, Bay Park, Clairemont Mesa, Fashion Valley, Kearny Mesa, Linda Vista, Mission Valley, North Clairemont, and Serra Mesa. Incumbent council member Donna Frye won reelection with a majority of the votes in the June primary.

District 8 
District 8 consisted of the communities of San Diego along the Mexico–United States border, including the communities of Barrio Logan, Egger Highlands, Grant Hill, Golden Hill, Logan Heights, Memorial, Nestor, Ocean View Hills, Otay Mesa West, Otay Mesa East, San Ysidro, Sherman Heights, Southcrest, Stockton, and Tijuana River Valley. Incumbent council member Ben Hueso, who had previously been elected to a partial term in 2005 after the resignation of Ralph Inzunza, was reelected with a majority of the votes in the June primary.

Council President
The new city council was sworn in December 2006. Scott Peters of district 1 was unanimously elected to a second term as council president after running unopposed. Peters had previously been elected as the first council president under the new strong mayor system of government in San Diego in early 2006. Young continued to serve as council president pro tem.

References 

2006 California elections
San Diego City Council elections
2000s in San Diego